Quintenic (Gallo: Qeintenit) is a commune in the Côtes-d'Armor department of Brittany in northwestern France.

Geography

Climate
Quintenic has a oceanic climate (Köppen climate classification Cfb).

Population
Inhabitants of Quintenic are called  in French.

See also
Communes of the Côtes-d'Armor department

References

Communes of Côtes-d'Armor